Kellin Yuvitza Mayén Hernández (born 26 July 1999), known as Yuvitza Mayén, is a Guatemalan footballer who plays as a defender for Unifut Rosal and the Guatemala women's national team.

References

1999 births
Living people
Women's association football defenders
Guatemalan women's footballers
Guatemala women's international footballers